Simon Larned (August 3, 1753 – November 16, 1817) was a U.S. Representative from Massachusetts.

Born in Thompson in the Connecticut Colony, Larned attended the common schools.
Larned served as Sheriff of Berkshire County.
He served in the Revolutionary War as Adjutant and Captain in Colonel William Shepard's regiment from January 1, 1777, to December 31, 1780, being aide-de-camp to General Glover, from October 1, 1779.
He engaged in mercantile pursuits in Pittsfield, Massachusetts, in 1784.
He was a Member of the Massachusetts House of Representatives in 1791.
County treasurer 1792–1812.
He served as colonel of the Ninth United States Infantry in the War of 1812 and was engaged in action at Plattsburg, along the Mohawk River.

Larned was admitted as an original member of The Society of the Cincinnati in the state of Massachusetts when it was established in 1783.

Larned was elected as a Democratic-Republican to the Eighth Congress to fill the vacancy caused by the resignation of Thomson J. Skinner and served from November 5, 1804, to March 3, 1805.
He served as president of the Berkshire Bank.
He died in Pittsfield, Massachusetts, on November 16, 1817.
He was interred in the Pittsfield Cemetery.

References

External links
 The Society of the Cincinnati
 The American Revolution Institute

Bibliography
 Dolliver, Louise Pearsons (1907), Lineage book, Volume XXIII, Washington, DC: Daughters of the American Revolution, p. 43.
 Wiley, Edgar J. (1917), Catalogue of Officers and Students of Middlebury College in Middlebury, Vermont and Others Who Have Received Degrees 1800-1915, Middlebury, VT: Middlebury College, p. 27.

1753 births
1817 deaths
Massachusetts sheriffs
Members of the Massachusetts House of Representatives
Burials in Massachusetts
Continental Army officers from Massachusetts
Politicians from Pittsfield, Massachusetts
Democratic-Republican Party members of the United States House of Representatives from Massachusetts
County treasurers in Massachusetts